George Goldsmith Cox (November 24, 1842 – February 19, 1920) was an American farmer and politician.

Born in Suffolk County, New York, Cox moved to Mineral Point, Wisconsin in 1850 and was a farmer. During the American Civil War, Cox served in the 2nd Wisconsin Cavalry Regiment. Cox served as chairman of the Mineral Point Town Board and superintendent of the poor. In 1879, 1880, 1885, and 1887, Cox served in the Wisconsin State Assembly and was a Republican. Cox died in Mineral Point, Wisconsin.

References

External links
 

1842 births
1920 deaths
People from Suffolk County, New York
People from Mineral Point, Wisconsin
People of Wisconsin in the American Civil War
Farmers from Wisconsin
Mayors of places in Wisconsin
Republican Party members of the Wisconsin State Assembly